John Stanley "Stan" Stoker (29 May 1944 – 10 October 2015) was an English cricketer.  Stoker was a right-handed batsman who bowled right-arm medium-fast.  He was born in Bearpark, County Durham.

Stoker made his debut in the Minor Counties cricket for Dorset, first appearing for the county in the 1966 Minor Counties Championship against Wiltshire.  He played Minor counties cricket for Dorset from 1966 to 1968, making 14 Minor Counties Championship appearances.  He later joined his native county of Durham, making his debut for the county against Cumberland in the 1973 Minor Counties Championship.  He played Minor counties cricket for Durham from 1973 to 1976, making 36 Minor Counties Championship appearances.  He made his List A for Durham debut against Hertfordshire in the 1974 Gillette Cup.  He took 3 wickets in the match for the cost of 16 runs from 12 overs, while with the bat he scored 4 runs before being dismissed by Alan Garofall.  Durham won the match by 74 runs.  He made a further List A appearance against Kent in the following round of the same competition.  He bowled 12 wicket-less overs in this match, while with the bat he was dismissed for 9 runs by Colin Cowdrey, with Kent winning by 116 runs.

References

External links
Stan Stoker at ESPNcricinfo
Stan Stoker at CricketArchive

1944 births
2015 deaths
People from Bearpark
Cricketers from County Durham
English cricketers
Dorset cricketers
Durham cricketers